Yeshivat Chovevei Torah Rabbinical School (YCT) is an Open Orthodox yeshiva, founded in 1999 by Rabbi Avi Weiss.

Currently located in the Riverdale neighborhood of the Bronx, New York, its mission is to educate and place rabbis who are "open, non-judgmental, knowledgeable, empathetic, and eager to transform Orthodoxy into a movement that meaningfully and respectfully interacts with all Jews, regardless of affiliation, commitment, or background." Its core values include a passionate commitment to the study of Torah and the tangential observance of halakha (Jewish law); intellectual openness and critical thinking in one's religious life; expanding the role of women; commitment to the broader Jewish community; and a responsibility to improve the world and to care for every human being in it regardless of faith.

YCT's rabbinic education program combines a classical curriculum in Tanakh, Talmud, and the codes of Jewish law with a program in pastoral counseling, leadership retreats, education in fund-raising, and other realities of contemporary religious leadership.

YCT ordained its first graduating class of rabbis in June 2004 and has continued to do so every June since. As of June 2019, the school had ordained 134 rabbis and has a placement rate of nearly 100%. Its current President and Rosh Yeshiva (head of school) is Rabbi Dov Linzer.

In addition to its rabbinical studies program, the yeshiva offers a public Jewish educational program in association with the Hebrew Institute of Riverdale at its Bronx location. YCT also runs a variety of events open to the entire Jewish community, including its annual yemei iyun ("study days") on Bible and Jewish Thought and a public lecture series.

History 
The origins of Yeshiva Chovevei Torah go back to 1996, when Rabbis Avi Weiss and Saul Berman founded a program known as MeORoT which provided supplemental lectures on issues in liberal Orthodoxy to rabbinical students then enrolled in Yeshiva University. The fellowship at that time was co-sponsored by Yeshiva University, Edah and Weiss's synagogue, the Hebrew Institute of Riverdale. In the following year, 1997, Weiss added the Torat Miriam Fellowship to the MeORoT program, inviting women involved in Jewish Studies on the graduate level to participate in these lectures. 

In September 1999, Weiss and Rabbi Dov Linzer launched Yeshivat Chovevei Torah as an undergraduate learning program primarily for students in Columbia University and Barnard College. The YCT University Program had Rabbi Linzer serving as its Rosh HaYeshiva and was housed at Congregation Ramath Orah, a Modern Orthodox congregation on 110th Street in Manhattan. The faculty consisted of three recent graduates of the Rabbi Isaac Elchanan Theological Seminary (RIETS) affiliated with Yeshiva University: Rabbi Dov Weiss, who also directed the program, Rabbi Barry Wimpfheimer, and Rabbi Ari Perl. 

In January 2000, the leadership of the YCT university program, which consisted of Rabbis Avi Weiss, Saul Berman, Dov Linzer and Dov Weiss decided to create a rabbinical school which would officially open in September 2000. In September 2000, the rabbinical school welcomed its first class of 7 students.

In January 2004, Yeshivat Chovevei Torah moved from its location in Ramath Orah to the Abraham Joshua Heschel High School on 60th Street and West End Avenue and then to the Kraft Center/Columbia Barnard Hillel on 115th Street in July 2005.  After spending five full years at the Columbia Hillel, the school then left Manhattan in the summer of 2010, moving to the Hebrew Institute of Riverdale, where it is at present.

Controversies over YCT came to a head when in 2006 YCT applied for membership in the Rabbinical Council of America, the rabbinical body affiliated with the Orthodox Union, the largest North American Modern and Centrist Orthodox body. YCT subsequently withdrew their application when it became apparent that the application would be denied.

Having ordained 27 rabbis as of June 2006, the count nearly doubled by June 2009 to 54, who, not being eligible for RCA membership, can join the International Rabbinic Fellowship, an organization co-founded in 2008 by Rabbis Avi Weiss and Marc Angel.

Terminology 
In the first 15 years of its history, YCT described itself as an Open Orthodox institution, and its mission statement made heavy use of the term that its founder Rabbi Avi Weiss had coined.

However, the term provoked harsh criticism. At a May 2014 gala, one member of the Moetzes Gedolei HaTorah, Rabbi Yaakov Perlow, called Open Orthodoxy heretical. In the fall of 2015, the Agudath Israel of America, an Ultra Orthodox rabbinical group, called  Yeshivat Chovevei Torah, Yeshivat Maharat, Open Orthodoxy, and other affiliated entities to be similar to other dissident movements throughout Jewish history in having rejected basic tenets of Judaism. And in 2016,  An op-ed in the Jewish Press strongly condemned the school, calling the philosophy "unorthodox" and suggesting its adherents "heretics".

Sylvia Barack Fishman, a professor of Judaic studies at Brandeis University, stated that some critics use the term Open Orthodox derogatorily rather than descriptively to delegitimize Modern Orthodox who support women's leadership in Judaism.

Since then, YCT has distanced itself from the term. The school has removed all references to Open Orthodoxy on its website, replacing "open" with "modern." In an interview with The Jewish Week in August 2017, Rabbi Asher Lopatin, the school's then-president said: "When they say, 'Open Orthodox,' I say, 'We are Modern Orthodox. We are a full part of Modern Orthodoxy.'". The affiliated women's rabbinical seminary, Yeshivat Maharat also uses Modern Orthodox.

Curriculum and pastoral counseling program 
Like classical Orthodox Rabbinic ordination programs, YCT's curriculum has a strong focus on Talmud and Halakha with particular emphasis on the areas of Sabbath observance, dietary laws, laws of family life, and mourning.  YCT's curriculum is also supplemented by a strong focus in Bible and Jewish thought. YCT states that the classical approaches to subject matters are complemented with academic and innovative methodologies. Their stated goal is to create knowledgeable, broadminded and critical-thinking Torah scholars, halakhic decision-makers and spiritual leaders. 

One of the more innovative areas of YCT's curriculum is an unprecedented emphasis on pastoral care and professional development. Whereas it is common in other rabbinical schools to offer a semester or a year of pastoral counseling courses, YCT's program spans the entire four-year curriculum. The pastoral counseling program is taught by leading psychiatric professionals, and includes formal classroom instruction, role-playing, clinical experience and mentored field work. The program places particular emphasis on topics that rabbis regularly encounter: religious doubt and personal change; rites of passage; adolescence; substance abuse; marital and family problems; sexual function and dysfunction; homosexuality; domestic violence; loss, tragedy and bereavement; and response to catastrophe.

The first-year courses are organized around basic principles of counseling. The second-year courses follow the life cycle, giving an overview of normal development as well as addressing potential difficulties. In their third and fourth years, students take seminars in chaplaincy, marital and family therapy, and psychology and religion. Fieldwork with direct clinical supervision is an essential part of the curriculum. In their third and fourth years, students rotate through an intensive chaplaincy program and meet regularly with senior clinicians to discuss pastoral issues that arise during their internships. 

One of the other hallmarks of the YCT pastoral counseling program is the introduction of the process group. A common feature of graduate psychology programs, a process group consists of the students from a given class year who meet weekly with a mental health professional throughout the full four years of the program. In this completely confidential setting, students are free to explore issues of faith, authority, training, personal situation, etc.

Faculty and administration 
Rabbi Dov Linzer has served as YCT's president from January 2018 – present, having succeeded Rabbi Asher Lopatin whose tenure lasted from July 2013 – July 2018 and who was the school's second president, following Rabbi Avi Weiss. YCT's faculty is headed by Rabbi Dov Linzer, the Rosh HaYeshiva.  Other faculty members include Rabbi Ysoscher Katz, Rabbi Nathaniel Helfgot, Rabbi Chaim Marder, Miriam Schacter and Dr. Michelle Friedman.
On 21 October 2007, Linzer was installed as the dean of Yeshivat Chovevei Torah, taking over from Weiss. Rabbi Jon Kelsen is the current  dean, while Linzer serves as President and Rosh Yeshiva.

Student body and alumni 
When the rabbinical school was founded, its first class had only 7 members.

However, after what Yeshiva University's student newspaper, The Commentator, called in 2002 an "aggressive marketing campaign", many young men who previously would have considered YU's rabbinical school are now attending YCT. A 2007 YU Commentator article reported YCT's enrollment to be 43 full-time students.

The first rabbi was ordained in 2003. According to a 2006 news article, YCT graduates about 10 students a year, and in a 2009 story it was reported that there were 54 total YCT graduates.

As of 2019, YCT has ordained over 130 rabbis serving throughout the US and around the world, who serve in synagogues, on college campus, as teachers and administrators, chaplains, religious entrepreneurs; leaders of Jewish institutions, and more.

Absorption of EDAH functions 
In July 2006, YCT officials announced that they would absorb some of the personnel and functions of the liberal Orthodox advocacy organization EDAH, which had announced its closure and became defunct. YCT assumed EDAH's journal, website, and audio-visual library. The school also took on EDAH's founding director, Rabbi Saul Berman, for a position as Director of Continuing Rabbinic Education.

Role of women in Judaism 

Yeshivat Chovevei Torah, (Yeshivat Maharat notwithstanding), accepts only male candidates for ordination. However, YCT, unlike a number of rabbis and institutions within Orthodox Judaism, has promoted expanded roles for women in ritual life and religious leadership. Founder Avi Weiss explained: "Yeshivat Chovevei Torah Rabbinical School, as an Orthodox institution, requires that its students daven only in synagogues with mechitzot [partitions for the separation of men and women]. The phenomenon of women receiving aliyot in a mechitza minyan is currently being debated on both a halachic and communal level within the Modern Orthodox community. YCT Rabbinical School does not currently take a position on this issue."

In June 2009, Weiss created the title MaHaRaT for Sara Hurwitz. He expressed his desire to have called her a rabbi, stating "She can do 95 percent of what other rabbis do". She was later titled "Rabba", a feminine version of the word "rabbi", despite female rabbis in other movements being called "rabbi". This led to complaints from the RCA, which led to Weiss stating he would not name future graduates as "rabba". Weiss subsequently resigned from the RCA. However, Yeshivat Maharat, which Weiss founded, allows its ordainees to choose their own titles, and in 2015 ordained Yaffa Epstein took the title Rabba. Also in 2015, Lila Kagedan was ordained by that same organization, and chose for herself the title Rabbi, making her their first graduate to take that title.

Criticism 
Mainstream Orthodox groups have criticized YCT for theological positions they believe are inconsistent with traditional values and halaka. The Orthodox Rabbinical Council of America does not accept the school's ordination as valid for membership.  In the fall of 2015, the Agudath Israel of America denounced moves to ordain women, and went even further, declaring Yeshivat Chovevei Torah, Yeshivat Maharat, Open Orthodoxy, and other affiliated entities to be similar to other dissident movements throughout Jewish history in having rejected basic tenets of Judaism.

Books and journals 
 Halakhic Realities: Collected Essays on Brain Death, ed. Zev Farber, Maggid Books, 2015. 
 Halakhic Realities: Collected Essays on Organ Donation, ed. Zev Farber, Maggid Books, 2016. 
 Helfgot, Nathaniel, ed., The Yeshivat Chovevei Torah Tanakh Companion to the Book of Samuel, Ben Yehuda Press, October 2006 
 Milin Havivin/Beloved Words – The Torah Journal of Yeshivat Chovevei Torah Rabbinical School

See also 
 Migdal Ohr
 Modern Orthodox Judaism
 Moshe Kletenik

References

External links 
 Yeshivat Chovevei Torah official site

Educational institutions established in 1999
Modern Orthodox Judaism in the United States
Chovevei Torah
Education in Manhattan
1999 establishments in New York City
Open Orthodox Judaism
Jewish seminaries
Yeshivas in New York (state)
Jews and Judaism in the Bronx